The Germany national football team ( or Die Mannschaft) has represented Germany in men's international football since 1908. The team is governed by the German Football Association (Deutscher Fußball-Bund), founded in 1900. Ever since the DFB was reinaugurated in 1949 the team has represented the Federal Republic of Germany. Under Allied occupation and division, two other separate national teams were also recognised by FIFA: the Saarland team representing the Saarland (1950–1956) and the East German team representing the German Democratic Republic (1952–1990). Both have been absorbed along with their records by the current national team. The official name and code "Germany FR (FRG)" was shortened to "Germany (GER)" following the reunification in 1990.

Germany is one of the most successful national teams in international competitions, having won four World Cups (1954, 1974, 1990, 2014), three European Championships (1972, 1980, 1996), and one Confederations Cup (2017). They have also been runners-up three times in the European Championships, four times in the World Cup, and a further four third-place finishes at World Cups. East Germany won Olympic Gold in 1976.

Germany is the only nation to have won both the FIFA World Cup and the FIFA Women's World Cup. At the end of the 2014 World Cup, Germany earned the highest Elo rating of any national football team in history, with a record 2,205 points. Germany is also the only European nation that has won a FIFA World Cup in the Americas.

Men's Honours

Major competitions 
FIFA World Cup
 Champions (4): 1954, 1974, 1990, 2014
 Runners-up (4): 1966, 1982, 1986, 2002
 Third place (4): 1934, 1970, 2006, 2010
 Fourth place (1): 1958

UEFA European Championship
 Champions (3): 1972, 1980, 1996
 Runners-up (3): 1976, 1992, 2008
 Third place (3): 1988, 2012, 2016

Summer Olympic Games
 Gold Medal (1): 1976
 Silver Medal (2): 1980, 2016
 Bronze Medal (3): 1964, 1972, 1988
 Fourth place (1): 1952

FIFA Confederations Cup
 Champions (1): 2017
 Third place (1): 2005

Minor competitions 
U.S. Cup
 Champions (1): 1993

Swiss Centenary Tournament
 Champions (1): 1995

Four Nations Tournament
 Third place (1): 1988

Azteca 2000 Tournament
 Third place (1): 1985

Awards 
FIFA World Cup Fair Play Trophy
 Winners (1): 1974

FIFA World Cup Most Entertaining Team
 Winners (1): 2010

FIFA Confederations Cup Fair Play Award
 Winners (1): 2017

FIFA Team of the Year
 Winners (3): 1993, 2014, 2017

Laureus World Sports Award for Team of the Year
 Winners (1): 2015

World Soccer World Team of the Year
 Winners (2): 1990, 2014

Unofficial Football World Championships
 Holders: 31 times

German Sports Team of the Year
 Winners (10): 1966, 1970, 1974, 1980, 1990, 1996, 2002, 2006, 2010, 2014

Silbernes Lorbeerblatt
 Winners (7): 1954, 1972, 1974, 1980, 1990, 1996, 2014

Gazzetta Sports World Team of the Year
 Winners (3): 1980, 1990, 2014

Bambi Award
 Winners (2): 1986, 1996

Deutscher Fernsehpreis
 Winners (1): 2010

Golden Hen
 Winners (3): 2006, 2010, 2014

Women's Honours

Major competitions 
FIFA Women's World Cup
 Champions (2): 2003, 2007
 Runners-up (1): 1995
 Fourth place (2): 1991, 2015

UEFA Women's Championship
 Champions (8): 1989, 1991, 1995, 1997, 2001, 2005, 2009, 2013
 Runners-up (1): 2022
 Fourth place (1): 1993

Summer Olympic Games
 Gold Medal (1): 2016
 Bronze Medal (3): 2000, 2004, 2008

Minor competitions 
Algarve Cup
 Champions (4): 2006, 2012, 2014, 2020
 Runners-up (3): 2005, 2010, 2013
 Third place (1): 2015
 Fourth place (3): 2002, 2008, 2009

Women's World Invitational Tournament
 Champions (2): 1981, 1984
 Third place (1): 1987

SheBelieves Cup
 Runners-up (2): 2016, 2017
 Fourth place (1): 2018

Four Nations Tournament
 Runners-up (1): 2002
 Third place (3): 2003, 2005, 2007

Mundialito Cup
 Runners-up (1): 1984

Arnold Clark Cup
 Fourth place (1): 2022

Awards 
FIFA Women's World Cup Fair Play Trophy
 Winners (1): 1991

FIFA Women's World Cup Most Entertaining Team
 Winners (1): 2003

Notes

References 

Germany national football team
Germany national football team records and statistics